Delvinaki is a former municipality in the Ioannina regional unit, Epirus, Greece. Since the 2011 local government reform it is part of the municipality Pogoni, of which it is a municipal unit. The municipal unit has an area of 255.8 km2, the community 54.8 km2. In 2011 its population was 772 for the village and 2,540 for the municipal unit. Delvinaki is part of the traditional area of Pogoni.

Delvinaki lies along the road GR-22/E853 which links Kalpaki with the Albanian border. The border crossing Kakavia is west of town.

Subdivisions
The municipal unit of Delvinaki is subdivided into the following communities (constituent villages in brackets):
Agia Marina
Argyrochori
Charavgi
Delvinaki
Farangi (formerly Gouveri) 
Kastani
Kerasovo
Kryoneri
Ktismata (Ktismata, Neochori)
Limni
Mavropoulo (Mavropoulo, Zavrocho, Chrysodouli)
Oreino Xirovaltou (Oreino, Xirovaltos)
Peristeri
Pontikates
Stratinista
Teriachi (Teriachi, Stavrodromi)
Vissani

Population

History
From the 14th century and to beginning of Ottoman rule Delvinaki was among the thriving settlements of the region together with nearby Dipalitsa, Kastaniani and Polytsiani. 
During the first decades of the 14th century, Albanians settled in the Pogoni region and their presence is evidenced through some place names derived from Albanian such as Delvinaki 'place of vineyards' and Gouveri (from gouva 'hollow'). The town was an important commercial centre during the Ottoman period. The church of the Dormition of the Theotokos in Delvinaki was erected in 1619. In the late 17th century, Ottoman traveler Evliya Çelebi passed through Delvinaki observing that it was a "prosperous" town on the border of the district of Pogoni, "inhabited by infidels all Albanians"; it contained 400 houses, 6000 fertile vineyards, 40-50 shops, 10 churches and 3 inns. Çelebi also noted that Delvinaki was a hass (revenue estate) of an Ottoman admiral and administered by a voivode with the settlement being "exempt from taxation and state interference." Those Albanian villagers who settled in the southern part of Pogoni were gradually assimilated by the Greek element. British traveler John Hobhouse noted in early 19th century that Delvinaki consisted of 300 dwellings inhabited by Greeks.

Delvinaki joined Greece after the Balkan Wars of 1913.

Culture
Delvinaki is home to Greek polyphonic singing and has a reach music tradition in the wider Pogoni region. It is one of the two main centres of folk music of Pogoni, the other being Parakalamos. An annual festival of polyphonic singing is held in August.

Notable people
Petroloukas Chalkias, musician.
Hatzimichalis Dalianis, hero of the Greek War of Independence.
Evangelos Psimmas, (1905–1962), bishop of Ermoupoli.
Konstantinos Iroklis Vasiadis, (1821–1890), scholar.

See also
List of settlements in the Ioannina regional unit

References

External links
Delvinaki (municipality) on GTP Travel Pages
Delvinaki (village) on GTP Travel Pages

Populated places in Ioannina (regional unit)